Rath Meave is a henge located near the Hill of Tara in  County Meath, Ireland. It is a National Monument.

Location

Description
The remains of Rath Meave consist of an approximately circular henge, about 700 metres long, enclosing an area of about 4 hectares.

A cut on the north side of Rath Medb's bank, presumably the entrance, is aligned with the oldest site at Tara, the Mound of the Hostages.

History

Rath Meave was constructed during the fourth phase of Tara's building, in the early Bronze Age (c. 2000–1500 BC). This was around the same time as the Mound of the Hostages was used for burials. It takes its name from Medb Lethderg, a Celtic sovereignty goddess who in Irish legend was the wife or lover of nine successive Kings of Tara. Her relationship to the better-known Medb of Cruachan, legendary Queen of Connacht, is unclear; they may be the same character, or one may have inspired the other. The name Medb means "intoxicator" and is cognate with "mead," making clear the connection between the marriage of the king to the sovereignty goddess and the use of alcohol at these ceremonies.

References
Archaeological sites in County Meath
National Monuments in County Meath